Manderfield is an unincorporated community located in Beaver County, Utah, United States.

See also

References

External links

Unincorporated communities in Beaver County, Utah
Unincorporated communities in Utah